Por la Boca Vive el Pez (English: The Fish Lives Through Its Mouth) is the fourth studio album by Spanish rock band Fito & Fitipaldis. It was published by DRO in 2006.

Track listing

Chart performance

Certifications

Reception

Por la boca vive el pez has received positive reviews. According to Allmusic, the album is certainly one of the most accomplished collections of pop/rock songs to come out of Spain in recent times.

References 

2006 albums
Fito & Fitipaldis albums
Spanish-language albums